Yeonggwang County (Yeonggwang-gun) is a county in South Jeolla Province, South Korea.

Speciality
Yeonggwang is a large producer of a fish, the small yellow croaker which are sometimes given by Korean people as a gift to others. It is called Yeonggwang gulbi (meaning "dried croaker") among Koreans, and it is nicknamed "rice thief" because of its wide popularity.

The fish originated from the Goryeo Dynasty. They migrate northward from the East China Sea, where they spend the winter season, to Yeonpyeongdo Island, to spawn at the start of the thawing season. They spawn at sea in front of Chilsan, near Beopseongpo in Yeonggwang, between April 10 and 30, while moving northward.

Nuclear power plant
The Hanbit Nuclear Power Plant was established in 1979 and has reached its full capacity. Now there are six plants. In 2007, plants of Yeonggwang achieved a position of third in the world, ranked by the degree of utilization.

Climate

Sister cities
 Gwangjin-gu, Seoul, South Korea

References

External links
 County government home page

 
Counties of South Jeolla Province